The Middle East Journal of Culture and Communication is a triannual peer-reviewed academic journal with a focus on culture, communication and politics in the Middle East. It was established in 2008 and is published by Brill Publishers. The editors-in-chief are Omar al-Ghazzi (London School of Economics), Zahera Harb (City University of London), Sune Haugbolle (Roskilde University), and Tarik Sabry (University of Westminster).

Abstracting and indexing
The journal is abstracted and indexed in the following databases:
Emerging Sources Citation Index

EBSCO databases
ERIH PLUS
Index Islamicus

Modern Language Association Database

Scopus

References

External links

Publications established in 2008
Triannual journals
English-language journals
Communication journals
Brill Publishers academic journals
Middle Eastern studies journals